Emil Birron (born Emil Bleeke; 1 January 1878 – 18 January 1952) was a German stage and film actor.

Selected filmography
 Alkohol (1919)
 Vendetta (1919)
 Demon Blood (1920)
 Hundemamachen (1920)
 The Last Hour  (1921)
 Playing with Fire (1921)
 The Story of a Maid (1921)
 The Weavers (1927)
 Make Me Happy (1935)

References

Bibliography
 Jung, Uli & Schatzberg, Walter. Beyond Caligari: The Films of Robert Wiene. Berghahn Books, 1999.

External links

1878 births
1952 deaths
German male film actors
German male silent film actors
20th-century German male actors
People from Elberfeld
Actors from Wuppertal